Ruth Mottram (born February 9, 1978) is a British climate scientist who is a researcher at the Danish Meteorological Institute. Her research considers the development of climate models and the long-term dynamics of glaciers.

Early life and education 
Mottram studied geography at the University of Edinburgh. She earned a master's degree in 2000 before starting a master's of research in the natural environment. Her master's research considered tor formation and the exposure history of the Cairngorm Plateau. She made use of Cosmogenic Beryllium-10 and Aluminium-26. Cosmogenic nuclides can be used to date terrestrial landforms. It allowed Mottram to test hypotheses by quantifying rates of bedrock erosion, the formation of regoliths and the ages of bedrock surfaces. She joined Shell, where she was a graduate trainee in exploration, before leaving to start a doctorate in glaciology. Her research considered crevasse formation and the calving of glaciers.

Research and career 
Mottram uses the regional atmospheric climate model HIRHAM5. HIRHAM combines HIRLAM (High Resolution Limited Area Model, a short-range weather forecasting system), and ECHAM, a global climate model. She is based at the Danish Meteorological Institute where she primarily carries out research into the interactions between atnmosphere and ice sheet. but also contributes to the WCRP's CORDEX initiative, making regional climate simulations in the polar regions. 

Mottram is part of the Polar Portal team that carries out near real-time monitoring of the Arctic cryosphere, including live updates of satellite datasets of sea ice, icebergs, permafrost and Greenland ice sheet surface mass balance, She is also part of the European Space Agency's  climate change initiative for the Greenland ice sheet, under which she has contributed to IMBIE, a large international initiative aimed at quantifying the loss of the ice sheet, and published several articles comparing satellite data with climate models.  Her work also aims to run climate models to assess the likely future evolution of both the Greenland ice sheet, and the Antarctic ice sheet. She is frequently cited in the media on topics related to Arctic climate change and the Greenland ice sheet and contributes an annual update on the state of the ice sheet to the Carbon Brief news site. She is also interested in glacier processes and her research testing numerical models of crevasse depths directly led to a well-used technique to estimate the frequency of calving in ice sheet models. 

has said, "The sea ice surrounding Greenland is also changing. It is thinner, it breaks up earlier, and opens up more frequently,". The ice sheet is the world's second largest ice body and has a considerable impact on global climate. Mottram studied the Kangiata Nunaata Sermia, a large tidewater glacier in Greenland as part of a wider team of scientists. Such glaciers are not constrained to lab and extend to the ocean or sea, and calve to form icebergs. They made careful observations of the tidewater glacier, identifying sedimentary sequences and identifying that during the 12th century the glacier advanced 15 km. She looks to understand the long-term glacial dynamics of the Greenland ice sheet.

Selected publications

References 

1978 births
Living people
21st-century British scientists
Alumni of the University of St Andrews
Alumni of the University of Edinburgh
Climatologists
Glaciologists